The Devil Strikes Again is the 22nd studio album by German heavy metal band Rage, released on 10 June 2016 through Nuclear Blast Records. Videos are made for the singles "My Way" and "The Devil Strikes Again".

Track listing

Bonus CD - Live in Warsaw
Recorded live at Progresja, Warsaw, Poland, 16 February 2016.

Personnel

 Peter "Peavy" Wagner – vocals, bass
 Marcos Rodriguez - guitar, backing vocals
 Vassilios "Lucky" Maniatopoulos - drums, backing vocals

References 

2016 albums
Rage (German band) albums
Nuclear Blast albums